Glyptaesopus oldroydi is a species of sea snail, a marine gastropod mollusk in the family Borsoniidae.

Description
The size of an adult shell attains 9 mm, its width 2.6 mm.

(Original description) The small shell is slender and has a fusiform shape. The spire is elevated. The apex is rounded. The shell contains seven convex whorls. The first three whorls are smooth. The remainder, with exception of the body whorl, are ornamented with about eighteen transverse ridges and two or three rather indistinct spiral grooves, the whole giving a cancellate appearance to the surface. On the body whorl the transverse and spiral sculpture are of about equal prominence, the transverse sculpture being more subdued than on the whorls above it. The suture is quite deeply impressed. The aperture is narrow and elliptical. The columella is truncated anteriorly. The outer lip is smooth and thin. The inner lip is smooth.

Distribution
This marine species occurs in the Pacific Ocean off Panama.

It was also found as a fossil from the Lower Pleistocene of San Pedro, California.

References

 Arnold, Ralph. The paleontology and stratigraphy of the marine Pliocene and Pleistocene of San Pedro, California. Vol. 3. The Academy, 1903.
 Keen, A. M. 1971. Sea Shells of Tropical West America. Marine mollusks from Baja California to Peru, ed. 2. Stanford University Press. xv, 1064 pp., 22 pls.

External links
 
 W.H. Dall (1908) Reports on the Mollusca and Brachiopoda, Bulletin of the Museum of Comparative Zoology at Harvard College. vol. 43
  Bouchet P., Kantor Yu.I., Sysoev A. & Puillandre N. (2011) A new operational classification of the Conoidea. Journal of Molluscan Studies 77: 273–308.

oldroydi
Gastropods described in 1903
Molluscs of the Pacific Ocean